DJ Okawari is an independent Japanese DJ, record producer and composer born and based in Shizuoka, Japan. His style mixes instrumental hip hop, nu jazz, and japanese jazz. Piano is an instrumental theme in his music. In his career, he has released seven studio albums: "Diorama" in 2008, "Mirror" in 2009, "Kaleidoscope" in 2011, "Compass" in 2017, "Restore" (with Emily Styler) and "Perfect Blue" in 2018, and “Nightfall” (with Celeina Ann) in 2019.

Biography 

DJ Okawari is known for his unique approach to music, blending piano jazz and hip-hop influences to create a mellow yet soothing vibe. Luv Letter (music by TSUKINOSORA) of the album Mirror was used in one of figure skater Daisuke Takahashi's routines at the 2010 World Figure Skating Championships. His music is also frequently played on YouTube; the videos have garnered views well above 10 million. The art for DJ Okawari's album covers were created by Japanese graphic artist Marumiyan.

Discography

Studio albums 

Diorama (2008)

Mirror (2009)

Kaleidoscope (2011)

Compass (2017)

Restore (2018) [collaboration with Emily Styler]

Perfect Blue (2018)

Nightfall (2019) [collaboration with Celeina Ann]

References 

Japanese DJs